The Derby Assembly Rooms is a events venue in Derby. It was built in 1977 in the brutalist style.

The Assembly Rooms building was designed by Hugh Casson and Neville Conder. It replaced an 18th-century building of the same name that burned down.

The building has been closed since a 2014 fire in the plant room of an adjacent multi-storey car park damaged the Assembly Rooms' ventilation system.

The venue has been used by Elton John, Iron Maiden, Judas Priest, Take That, The Smiths, Tony Bennett, U2, Frankie Laine, the Manic Street Preachers and others.

References

Brutalist architecture in England
Buildings and structures in Derby
Culture in Derby
Assembly rooms
Unused buildings in the United Kingdom